Ayman Azhil (born 10 April 2001) is a German professional footballer who plays as a midfielder for Bayer Leverkusen.

Club career
A youth product of Bayer Leverkusen, Azhil joined Waalwijk on loan on 31 August 2020. Azhil made his professional debut with Waalwijk in a 1–0 Eredivisie win over Heracles Almelo on 17 October 2020.

International career
Born in Germany, Azhil is of Moroccan descent.

References

External links

2001 births
Living people
German people of Moroccan descent
Footballers from Düsseldorf
German footballers
Association football midfielders
Eredivisie players
Bayer 04 Leverkusen players
RKC Waalwijk players
German expatriate footballers
German expatriate sportspeople in the Netherlands
Expatriate footballers in the Netherlands